David Wakefield (born July 14, 1994) is an American cricketer. In August 2018, he was named in the United States' squad for the 2018–19 ICC World Twenty20 Americas Qualifier tournament in Morrisville, North Carolina.

In October 2018, he was named in the United States' squad for the 2018–19 Regional Super50 tournament in the West Indies. He made his List A debut for the United States in the 2018–19 Regional Super50 tournament on October 6, 2018.

References

External links
 

1994 births
Living people
American cricketers
Sportspeople from Charlotte, North Carolina